Anders Karl Gustaf Linderoth (born 21 March 1950) is a Swedish football coach and former player who played as a midfielder. He is best remembered for representing Helsingsborgs IF, Östers IF, Marseille, and Mjällby AIF during a club career that spanned between 1967 and 1984. A full international between 1972 and 1980, he won 40 caps and scored two goals for the Sweden national team and represented his country at the 1978 FIFA World Cup. He was awarded Guldbollen in 1976 as Sweden's best player of the year.

Club career 
He debuted in Allsvenskan for Helsingborgs IF, and during his spell with Östers IF he made his national team debut and received Guldbollen. In 1977, he moved to play professionally in Olympique de Marseille.

International career 
He played 40 matches and scored two goals for Sweden, the tally including three matches at the 1978 FIFA World Cup in Argentina.

Post-playing career 
After retiring as a football player Linderoth has worked as a coach. His achievements include leading IF Elfsborg to Allsvenskan. From 2001 until 2006 he coached Hammarby IF. Linderoth managed Viborg FF in about 11 month in 2007.

Personal life 
Anders Linderoth is the father of former Sweden national team player Tobias Linderoth.

Honours 
Individual

 Guldbollen: 1977

References

External links
 

1950 births
Living people
People from Kristianstad Municipality
Swedish footballers
Association football midfielders
Sweden international footballers
1978 FIFA World Cup players
Allsvenskan players
Ligue 1 players
Helsingborgs IF players
Östers IF players
Olympique de Marseille players
Swedish football managers
Mjällby AIF managers
IF Elfsborg managers
Stabæk Fotball managers
Hammarby Fotboll managers
Viborg FF managers
Landskrona BoIS managers
Swedish expatriate footballers
Swedish expatriate football managers
Swedish expatriate sportspeople in France
Expatriate footballers in France
Swedish expatriate sportspeople in Norway
Expatriate football managers in Norway
Swedish expatriate sportspeople in Denmark
Expatriate football managers in Denmark
Footballers from Skåne County